Abitov (masculine) or Abitova (feminine) is a surname. Notable people with the surname include:

Farukh Abitov (born 1988), Kyrgyzstani footballer
Inga Abitova (born 1982), Russian long-distance runner

See also
 Abilov
 Abitovo